Floating rate may refer to:
Floating interest rate
Floating rate note
Floating exchange rate